Francis Mallmann (born January 14, 1956) is an Argentine celebrity chef, author, and restaurateur who specializes in Argentine cuisine, and especially in Patagonian cuisine with a focus on various Patagonian methods of barbecuing food. He has been featured on numerous international television programmes, as well as on the Netflix original series Chef's Table.

Early life and education
Mallmann was born in Acassuso, Buenos Aires Province in 1956. In 1958, he moved to Bariloche in Patagonia when his father was employed as the head of the Balseiro Institute. It was there where Mallmann started working as a cook on a boat for tourists on Lake Nahuel Huapi in 1970.

Career
At the age of nineteen, he began managing a restaurant with a partner. He then, at the age of twenty, travelled to Paris, where he spent over two years learning alongside Alain Chapel and other reputable chefs.

After returning to Argentina, he spent several years driving the kitchen of a fashionable restaurant. In 1983 he decided to open his own restaurant on Honduras street in Palermo. It was open only at night and behind closed doors. During the day, Mallmann worked as a cooking teacher.

During this time, he wrote his first book, La Cocina al instante, which was published in 1984.

He began working in television in the early 1980s. Between 1987 and 1996, the program was recorded in his restaurant and, in the summer months, in Punta del Este, excluding 1992, when the program was recorded at the Seville Expo where Mallmann was representing Argentina. His visibility in television significantly influenced the reach and scope of his work.

Mallmann is Argentina's most famous chef known for his open-fire cooking. He currently runs 9 restaurants worldwide: Patagonia Sur (Argentina), Los Fuegos (Miami), Fuego de Apalta (Chile), 1884 Restaurant (Argentina), Garzón (Uruguay), Bodega Fuegos (Argentina), Orégano (Mendoza), Mallmann at Chateau La Coste (France).

Personal life
In April 2016, Mallmann married Vanina Chimeno, the mother of his two daughters. He has five other children, from previous relationships.

References

External links
 Restaurante Patagonia Sur

1956 births
Living people
Argentine television chefs
Argentine people of German descent
Argentine people of Uruguayan descent